Meshadilyar (also, Mashadlyar, Meshadili, and Meshadlyar) is a village in the Neftchala Rayon of Azerbaijan.

References 

Populated places in Neftchala District